Revista Médica de Chile is a peer-reviewed scientific journal covering aspects of internal medicine. It is published by the Sociedad Médica de Santiago and the editor-in-chief is Fernando Florenzano U. The journal was established in 1872.

Abstracting and indexing
The journal is abstracted and indexed in Index Medicus, SciELO, Chemical Abstracts and Social Sciences Citation Index.

References

External links 
 

Internal medicine journals
Publications established in 1872
Academic journals published by non-profit organizations of Chile
Multilingual journals